Edward Leonard Klewicki (May 6, 1912 – July 20, 1997) was an American football player. Of Polish descent, he is in the National Polish-American Hall of Fame.

Klewicki was born in Pittsburgh and moved to Hamtramck, Michigan with his family at a young age. At the time, Hamtramck was an enclave of Polish immigrants in the Detroit area. He graduated from Hamtramck High School in 1929. During his high school career, he was the catcher on the school's first championship baseball team and starred in the backfield for the football team. Klewicki received his school's highest graduation award for combining achievement in scholarship, athletics and citizenship.

Klewicki moved on the play College football at Michigan State College (later to become Michigan State University). His college coach, Charles Bachman, rated Klewicki as the best defensive end he had ever coached. The New York Sun selected him to the second-team 1934 College Football All-America Team, and he was named MVP of the 1934 Michigan State Spartans football team.

In 1935, Klewicki signed a pro contract with the Detroit Lions and was a member of the NFL's World Championship team that season. He continued to play pro football through the 1938 season.

Klewicki earned a B.S. degree from Michigan State and attended Purdue University for post-graduate work. He served in a number of positions including president of the Michigan State Varsity Alumni for two years as well as secretary for the same club for four years. In addition, he served as president of the Detroit Lions Alumni and the president of the Lansing Country Club.

Klewicki played a key role in the Detroit Lions' 26–7 triumph over the New York Giants for the National Football League crown on a raw, gloomy afternoon at the University of Detroit Stadium before 15,000 fans on December 19, 1935. In the early minutes of play, Lions' coach Potsy Clark decided to surprise the Giants with a shotgun offense.

Glenn Presnell, the Lions' passer, fired a long pass intended for Klewicki, but the ball hit New York Giants' Ed Danowski's chest. The ball squirted high in the air, but Klewicki reached out quickly, gathered the ball in and put the Lions into scoring position from the two-yard line.

Ace Gutowsky plunged for a touchdown, Presnell kicked the extra point and the Lions led 7–0 on their way to the championship.

References

1912 births
1997 deaths
American football ends
Detroit Lions players
Michigan State Spartans football players
Purdue University alumni
People from Hamtramck, Michigan
Sportspeople from Wayne County, Michigan
Players of American football from Michigan
Players of American football from Pennsylvania
American people of Polish descent